Desert Breeze Lake is located in Desert Breeze Park in west Chandler, Arizona, US, southwest of Ray Road and McClintock Drive on Desert Breeze Boulevard.

Fish species
 Rainbow trout
 Largemouth bass
 Sunfish
 Catfish (channel)
 Tilapia
 Carp

References

External links
 Arizona Fishing Locations Map
 Arizona Boating Locations Facilities Map
 Video of Desert Breeze Lake

Reservoirs in Maricopa County, Arizona
Reservoirs in Arizona